William Stratford Dugdale DL (1 April 1800 – 15 September 1871) was a British Tory (and later Conservative Party) politician.

Early life
He was the only son of Dugdale Stratford Dugdale of Merevale Hall, Warwickshire and his wife, the Hon. Charlotte Curzon, daughter of Assheton Curzon, 1st Viscount Curzon. His father was a Member of Parliament (MP) for Warwickshire.

William was educated at Westminster School and at Christ Church, Oxford. He married Harriet Ella Portman in 1827, and the couple had 10 children.

Member of Parliament
Dugdale entered the unreformed House of Commons at the 1830 general election as an MP for the borough of Shaftesbury in Dorset. He did not contest that seat at the 1831 general election, when he was returned unopposed for the rotten borough of Bramber in Sussex.

Bramber was disenfranchised by the Reform Act 1832, and at the 1832 general election he was returned as a member for North Warwickshire. He held that seat until he retired from Parliament at the 1847 election.

Other interests
Dugdale was a Justice of the peace and Deputy Lieutenant for the County of Warwickshire, held a commission in the Warwickshire Yeomanry and was a trustee of Rugby School.

References

External links
 
 

1800 births
1871 deaths
Tory MPs (pre-1834)
Conservative Party (UK) MPs for English constituencies
UK MPs 1830–1831
UK MPs 1831–1832
UK MPs 1832–1835
UK MPs 1835–1837
UK MPs 1837–1841
UK MPs 1841–1847
People from Atherstone
People educated at Westminster School, London
Alumni of Christ Church, Oxford
Deputy Lieutenants of Warwickshire
Warwickshire Yeomanry officers
English justices of the peace